Stefan Hölzlwimmer (born 9 March 1951) is a West German former luger who competed in the late 1970s. He won the bronze medal in the men's doubles event at the 1977 FIL European Luge Championships in Königssee, West Germany.

Hölzlwimmer also finished fourth in the men's doubles event at the 1976 Winter Olympics in Innsbruck.

His best overall finish in the Luge World Cup was third in men's doubles in the 1977-8 inaugural season.

References

External links
1976 Winter Olympic men's doubles results.
List of European luge champions 
List of men's doubles luge World Cup champions since 1978.

1951 births
Living people
German male lugers
Olympic lugers of West Germany
Lugers at the 1972 Winter Olympics
Lugers at the 1976 Winter Olympics
20th-century German people